Santhanam is an Indian actor who has predominantly appeared in Tamil films as a comedian and also has appeared in films in a lead role. He began his career on television shows including Vijay TV's Lollu Sabha enacting the lead role in spoofs of Tamil films. He was subsequently given a chance by actor Silambarasan in a supporting role in Manmadhan (2004) and then was signed on to appear in films including Sachien (2005) and Polladhavan (2007). He appeared in a one-off leading role in Shankar's production Arai En 305-il Kadavul (2008) and subsequently became a staple feature as a comedian in successful Tamil films during the period, with his market popularity helping stuck films find distributors. Santhanam has also had embarked on collaborations with directors including M. Rajesh's comic trilogy of Siva Manasula Sakthi (2009), Boss Engira Bhaskaran (2010) and Oru Kal Oru Kannadi (2012).

Film

As actor

Discography

As singer

References 

Indian filmographies
Male actor filmographies